Kōshirō, Koshiro or Koushirou (written: , , , ,  or ) is a masculine Japanese given name. Notable people with the name include:

, Japanese footballer
, Japanese politician
, various kabuki actors
, Japanese actor and kabuki actor
, Japanese actor
, Japanese print maker and photographer
, Japanese baseball player
, Japanese figure skater
, Japanese Paralympic swimmer
, Japanese footballer
, Japanese jockey
, Japanese politician
, Japanese baseball player
, Japanese president of the company Ancient

Fictional characters:
 (Izzy Izumi in English dub), a fictional character from Digimon Adventure.
, a fictional character from Machine Robo Rescue. 
, a fictional character from The Kouga Ninja Scrolls

Koshirō or Koshirou is a separate given name, though it may be romanized the same way:

 (1883–1958), Imperial Japanese Navy admiral

Japanese masculine given names